Thomas Webb (born 17 April 1989) is an English footballer who plays as a forward for Tilbury. He was a product of the Colchester United Academy, going on to make one first-team substitute appearance for the club. He has also represented Folkestone Invicta, Halstead Town, East Thurrock United and AFC Sudbury.

Career

Born in Chelmsford, Webb joined the Colchester United Academy at the age of 11. He featured regularly in Colchester's senior youth sides prior to his 16th birthday and finished as top scorer in both of his apprenticeship years with the club. His willingness and ability saw him awarded a professional contract in the summer of 2007, signing a deal alongside fellow youth-team products Tom Devaux, Medy Elito and Anthony Wordsworth.

Webb made his first and only first-team appearance for Colchester during an injury and suspension crisis during their second-ever season in the Championship, featuring as a substitute at the first-ever competitive fixture at Shrewsbury Town's New Meadow stadium on 14 August 2007. As the fixture went to extra time and Colchester conceding in the 106th minute, Webb was brought on as a replacement for defender John White in the 112th minute as the U's desperately searched for a goal. It wasn't to be a dream debut for Webb as Colchester were defeated 1–0.

In February 2008, Webb was sent on loan for one month to Folkestone Invicta. He was then released at the end of the 2007–08 season as Colchester were relegated from the Championship to League One. He was released alongside Tom Devaux, Danny Granville, Luke Guttridge and Kevin Watson, while Aidan Davison and Teddy Sheringham retired.

Following his release from Colchester, Webb travelled to Spain to join the Glenn Hoddle Academy, before joining Harlow Town. He then signed for Halstead Town prior to the 2009–10 season. He signed for AFC Sudbury in May 2010, scoring two goals in 21 appearances prior to his release from the club in January 2011. Webb then returned to the club in March 2011, where he remained until the end of the season. Summer 2011 saw Webb depart Sudbury, joining Tilbury, with whom he stayed until the end of the 2011–12 season. He once again returned to Sudbury for the beginning of the 2012–13 season, but yet again departed to Tilbury in December 2012.

References

External links

1989 births
Living people
Sportspeople from Chelmsford
English footballers
Association football forwards
Colchester United F.C. players
Folkestone Invicta F.C. players
Harlow Town F.C. players
Halstead Town F.C. players
A.F.C. Sudbury players
Tilbury F.C. players